Joseph Erskine (26 January 1934 – 18 February 1990) was a heavyweight boxer from the Butetown district of Cardiff, Wales. He was an Amateur Boxing Association Champion, Inter-Services Champion, and British Army Champion in 1953. He began fighting as a professional in 1954 and was trained by Freddie Elvin. He held the British heavyweight title from August 1956 to June 1958. In all, he won 45 of his 54 professional bouts, losing 8, with one drawn. His best wins were against George Chuvalo, Henry Cooper, Dick Richardson, Uli Ritter, Jack Bodell, Johnny Williams, Joe Bygraves and Willie Pastrano.

Erskine was a small heavyweight who outmaneuvered rather than overpowered his opponents. Angelo Dundee who saw his prospect Pastrano defeated by Erskine said he was surprised by his skill – further remarking that if Erskine had been just a bit bigger he could have been a world beater.

Career
On 15 December 1955, Erskine had his first fight against Henry Cooper, at Harringay Arena, in an eliminator for the British heavyweight title, and won the ten-round fight on points.

On 27 August 1956, Erskine won the British heavyweight title, which had been vacated by the retirement of Don Cockell. He beat fellow Welshman, Johnny Williams on points in a fifteen-round fight at the Maindy Stadium, Cardiff.

On 17 September 1957, he added the British Empire (Commonwealth) heavyweight title, when he beat Henry Cooper for the second time. The fight was at Harringay Arena over fifteen rounds, and was won on points.

He successfully defended his British Empire (Commonwealth) against Jamaican-born heavyweight Joe Bygraves on 25 November 1957, again winning over fifteen rounds on points.

On 21 February 1958, he unsuccessfully fought for the European heavyweight title against Ingemar Johansson, in Gothenburg, Sweden, losing on a technical knockout in the thirteenth round.

On 3 June 1958, he defended both his titles against Brian London, of Blackpool in a bout at the White City Stadium, London. Erskine was knocked out in the eighth round.

On 24 February 1959, Erskine fought and defeated the talented American boxer Willie Pastrano, who was later (in 1964) to become World light-heavyweight champion. The fight was at the Wembley Stadium over ten rounds and Erskine won on points.

On 24 June 1959, he fought another Welsh boxer, Dick Richardson in a ten-round bout at Coney Beach Arena, Porthcawl, Wales, and won on points.

In the meantime Henry Cooper had defeated Brian London to take the British and Commonwealth titles from him. On 17 November 1959, Erskine fought Cooper for both titles, having beaten him on their two previous meetings. The bout was held at the Earls Court Arena, London. Cooper won the fight on a technical knockout. Cooper, who was renowned for the power of his left hook, floored Erskine twice with terrific left hooks and Erskine was hanging almost unconscious over the lower rope when the referee stopped the bout.

On 21 March 1961, Erskine fought Cooper again for the two titles, this time at the Empire Pool, Wembley, and again lost on a technical knockout, this time in the fifth round.

Erskine went to Toronto, Ontario, Canada to fight George Chuvalo, who was hoping to show that he had the talent to fight for the world title against Floyd Patterson. Unfortunately for Chuvalo the fight, on 2 October 1961, was stopped in the fifth round and Chuvalo was disqualified for persistent head butting. Erskine claimed that he was butted eight times during the five rounds, while Chuvalo claimed he was retaliating for getting thumbed in the eye by Joe.

On 2 April 1962, he fought Cooper for the fifth and last time, this time at the Ice Rink, Nottingham. Cooper retained his titles by winning on a technical knockout in the ninth round.

On 13 October 1963, he fought the famous German southpaw, Karl Mildenberger, in Dortmund, Germany, and lost the ten-round bout on points.

On 3 March 1964, Erskine fought Jack Bodell, a British champion of the future, and defeated him on points over ten rounds.

His last fight was against Billy Walker on 27 October 1964 at the Empire Pool, Wembley. He lost the ten-round bout on points.

In his 54 professional bouts, he won 45 (13 on knock-outs), and lost 8 (6 on knock-outs). One of his bouts was drawn.

Professional boxing record

Genealogical and personal information
Joe Erskine was the cousin of the rugby union, and rugby league footballer of the 1950s and 1960s for Cardiff IAC (RU), Wales (RL), and Halifax; Johnny Freeman.
Joe later lived in Newport and frequently visited the Riverview club in Pillgwenlly. 
Joe stayed involved in boxing, and was a big fan of David Pearce.

He was one of many signatories in a letter to The Times on 17 July 1958 opposing 'the policy of apartheid' in international sport and defending 'the principle of racial equality which is embodied in the Declaration of the Olympic Games'.

See also
 List of British heavyweight boxing champions

References

 Brown, Geoff and Hogsbjerg, Christian. Apartheid is not a Game: Remembering the Stop the Seventy Tour campaign. London: Redwords, 2020. .

External links
 

1934 births
1990 deaths
Welsh male boxers
Heavyweight boxers
Boxers from Cardiff
England Boxing champions
People from Butetown